Craig Brown (22 January 1893 – 23 November 1963) was a Scottish footballer who played as a centre half for Armadale, Bradford City, Motherwell, Hibernian and the Scottish League XI. He also played for an unofficial 'Scotland' team in a tour of North America organised by Third Lanark in 1921.

References

1893 births
1963 deaths
Footballers from East Ayrshire
Association football central defenders
Scottish footballers
Carluke Rovers F.C. players
Peebles Rovers F.C. players
Bathgate F.C. players
Armadale F.C. players
Bradford City A.F.C. players
Motherwell F.C. players
Hibernian F.C. players
English Football League players
Scottish Junior Football Association players
Scottish Football League players
Scottish Football League representative players